

Hurling Roll of Honour

The teams listed below are those which took part in the Interprovincial Hurling Championship Final (formerly the Railway Cup Final) in the year listed.

 
Interprovincial finals